Harry Everett Mitchell (born July 18, 1940) is an American politician and educator who served as a U.S. Representative representing  from 2007 until 2011. He is a member of the Democratic Party.

Early life, education and career
Born and raised in Tempe, Arizona, Mitchell earned a bachelor's degree in political science from Arizona State University in 1962. He later earned a Master of Public Administration degree from ASU in 1980.

He was a teacher at Tempe High School, his high school alma mater, 1964–1992. He was also a professor.

Early political career 
In 1970, Harry Mitchell sought and won a seat on the elected-at-large Tempe City Council. Re-elected in 1974, Mitchell ran for Mayor of Tempe in 1978, gaining a majority of votes cast in the primary and avoiding a runoff. He went on to win every subsequent election for mayor in landslides until his retirement in 1994. A large statue of Mitchell stands just off Mill Avenue, next to City Hall and the other buildings comprising the Harry E. Mitchell Municipal Complex.

After retiring in 1994, Mitchell sought the Arizona Democratic Party's nomination for Arizona Superintendent of Public Instruction, a constitutionally mandated statewide-elected official charged with the management of Arizona's public schools. Mitchell narrowly lost in the primary – he attributes his election loss to his inexperience in partisan races – and his opponent went on to lose the general election.

Four years later, however, Mitchell sought and won a seat in the Arizona Senate, representing Tempe and parts of southern Scottsdale. Even though his district was considered a "swing" district, Mitchell managed to win with clear majorities in each successive election. He ran under Arizona's Clean Elections law in each legislative race, which provides public financing to statewide and legislative candidates as long as the candidates abide by certain restrictions and qualifications.

Facing term limits, Mitchell ran his last campaign for Arizona Senate in 2004. One year later, with the 2006 midterm elections approaching, Mitchell ran unopposed for chair of the Arizona Democratic Party after chairman Jim Pederson stepped down to run for the United States Senate. He was elected on August 20, 2005.

Mitchell oversaw much of the early ground work as the Arizona Democratic Party prepared for statewide elections on November 7, 2006. The Democrats recaptured the Tucson city council from years of Republican control on February 1, 2006.

U.S. House of Representatives

Committee assignments 
 Committee on Science and Technology
 Subcommittee on Technology and Innovation
 Committee on Transportation and Infrastructure
 Subcommittee on Aviation
 Subcommittee on Highways and Transit
 Subcommittee on Water Resources and Environment
 Committee on Veterans' Affairs
 Subcommittee on Oversight and Investigations

Mitchell was a member of the Blue Dog Coalition who emphasize bipartisanship and cooperation with members of other parties. His voting record has been described as blue dog and centrist. He has voted for legislation largely supported by Democrats in Congress, such as the State Children's Health Insurance Program. Although he expressed reservations about many of the provisions of the Patient Protection and Affordable Care Act, he ultimately voted for it.  Stating it was a "matter of principle," he declined coverage under the Federal Employees Health Benefits Program in favor of Medicare.  He voted for the 2009 stimulus plan and has also stated he supports extending the Bush tax cuts.

Political campaigns

2006

In the spring of 2006, a poll commissioned by the Arizona Democratic Party and the DCCC, was leaked; the poll showed Republican J.D. Hayworth would be in a tight race against any of a handful of Democratic opponents; the district was rated "Toss-Up" by the Cook Political Report. Mitchell was pressured by several Arizona politicians and Rep. Rahm Emanuel, then head of the DCCC, to enter the race against Hayworth.

Mitchell stepped down as state party chairman on April 7. He entered the race on April 10 and raised a total of $213,209 for his campaign in less than two weeks.

By of the end of June 2006, Mitchell had nearly $700,000 on hand. An October 16 SurveyUSA poll showed Hayworth leading Mitchell by only 48% to 45%. On October 27, 2006, the Arizona Republic departed from its past endorsements of Hayworth and instead endorsed Mitchell. The polls demonstrated a slow, but deliberate, growth in the strength of Mitchell's popularity over the next few weeks.

On the evening of November 7, election day, most national and state news media outlets declared Mitchell the winner. However, Hayworth refused to concede, citing the significant number of outstanding absentee and early-voting ballots. As the results were updated each day, Hayworth never demonstrated the significant gains he anticipated. Hayworth conceded on November 14, though Mitchell did not acknowledge his victory until November 22. Mitchell ended up winning by more than 8,000 votes.

When he took office on January 3, 2007, Mitchell became the first Anglo Democrat to represent a significant portion of Phoenix since Sam Coppersmith and Karan English left office in 1995.

2008

Mitchell was reelected in 2008 with 53% of the popular vote over his Republican challenger, former Maricopa County treasurer David Schweikert.

2010

Mitchell lost his bid for reelection to Republican nominee David Schweikert.

This district has traditionally leaned Republican (R+5 according to analyst Charlie Cook). Thus, according to many analysts, Mitchell faced a difficult reelection campaign. Considering that his district was won by Bush in '04, but not Obama in '08, CQ Politics rated his district as tossup. Sarah Palin had also set a goal of replacing Mitchell with a "common sense conservative."

2012

Mitchell was considered a possible candidate for the U.S. House in 2012 in his former district, which had been renumbered as the 9th district and made slightly more competitive.  However, he decided against running.

Electoral history

Personal life

Mitchell and his wife, Marianne, have two children. Their son, Mark Mitchell, is a former mayor of Tempe. Other politically active members of his family have included his brother, Robert Mitchell, who served as mayor and council member of Casa Grande, and his grandfather, William W. Mitchell Sr., who served as a state legislator. Mitchell is a Catholic. Marianne Mitchell died on May 27, 2019, after a years-long battle with Alzheimer's disease, the city of Tempe announced on May 29. She was 78.

References

External links

 Harry Mitchell for Congress official campaign site
 
 
 Profile at SourceWatch

|-

|-

|-

Mayors of Tempe, Arizona
Democratic Party Arizona state senators
Arizona Democratic Party chairs
Arizona State University alumni
1940 births
Living people
Arizona city council members
Democratic Party members of the United States House of Representatives from Arizona
ASU College of Public Service & Community Solutions alumni
21st-century American politicians